Keith Reynolds (born 25 December 1963) is a British former cyclist. Following national success as a junior where he won the season long National Junior Road Series in 1981, he competed in the team time trial event at the 1984 Summer Olympics.

He also represented England and won a gold medal in the road team time trial, at the 1986 Commonwealth Games in Edinburgh, Scotland.

References

External links
 

1963 births
Living people
British male cyclists
Olympic cyclists of Great Britain
Cyclists at the 1984 Summer Olympics
Sportspeople from Solihull
Commonwealth Games medallists in cycling
Commonwealth Games gold medallists for England
Cyclists at the 1986 Commonwealth Games
Medallists at the 1986 Commonwealth Games